Higashino (written: 東野) is a Japanese surname. Notable people with the surname include:

Arisa Higashino (東野 有紗, born 1996), Japanese badminton player
, Japanese writer
, Japanese comedian and television presenter
, Japanese video game composer
, Japanese motorcycle racer
, Japanese basketball coach

See also
Higashino Station (disambiguation), multiple train stations in Japan

Japanese-language surnames